A mobile virtual network enabler (MVNE) is a company that provides network infrastructure and related services, such as business support systems, administration, and operations support systems to a mobile virtual network operator (MVNO).  This enables MVNOs to offer services to their own customers with their own brands. The MVNE does not have a relationship with consumers, but rather is a provider of network enablement platforms and services.

MVNEs specialize in planning, implementation, and management of mobile services. Typically this includes SIM provisioning and configuration, customer billing, customer relationship management, and value-added service platforms. In effect, they enable an MVNO to outsource both the initial integration with the MNO, and the ongoing business and technical operations management. A related type of company is a mobile virtual network aggregator (MVNA). MVNE is a telecom solution, whereas MVNA is a business model which includes wholesale of an operator's airtime and routing of traffic over the MVNE's own switches.

The benefits of using an MVNE include a reduction in the upfront capital expenses of an MVNO, financing arrangements offered by MVNEs to cover start-up costs, and reduced wholesale airtime costs achieved through economies of scale of hosting multiple MVNOs on a single MVNE platform. Other potential benefits include reduced operational expenses via outsourcing management of business and technical operations, smoother launch processes, and benefiting from previous experience of the MVNE as a negotiating channel for smaller MVNOs to reach a wholesale agreement with the MNO.

Using an MVNE may not be appropriate for all MVNOs. The considerations for this decision are manifold; however, some of the key reasons for an MVNO to not use an MVNE would be:
 The MVNO is large enough to achieve volume efficiency when going direct to the host operator (usually several hundred thousand subscribers).
 The brand and distribution channels are sufficiently strong to negotiate a joint-venture or direct relationship and obtain better margins.
 The MVNO has access to existing telecom infrastructure, for example switches, international capacity, fixed infrastructure, and billing platforms.

List of Mobile Virtual Network Enablers 
 Pareteum MVNE
 1&1 Drillisch
 Bouygues Telecom Business – Distribution (BTBD, formerly called Euro-Information Telecom)
 Effortel
 Isoton
 Kajeet (previously dba Arterra Mobility)
 Medion AG
 Transatel

See also
 Business Process Framework (eTOM)
 Mobile network operator
 Mobile virtual network operator
 Operations, administration and management (OAM)

References

Business software
Telecommunications systems
Mobile technology
Telecommunications infrastructure